The men's hammer throw competition at the 1976 Summer Olympics in Montreal, Quebec, Canada took place on 26–28 July. There were 20 competitors from 13 nations. The maximum number of athletes per nation had been set at 3 since the 1930 Olympic Congress. The event was won by Yuriy Sedykh of the Soviet Union, the nation's second consecutive and fourth overall victory in the men's hammer throw (moving out of a tie with Hungary into sole possession of second-most all-time after the United States' seven). The Soviets swept the medals, with Aleksey Spiridonov taking silver and defending champion Anatoliy Bondarchuk earning bronze. It was the third medal sweep in the men's hammer throw (the United States had done it in 1900 and 1904). Bondarchuk was the seventh man to win multiple medals in the event.

Background

This was the 17th appearance of the event, which has been held at every Summer Olympics except 1896. Seven of the 20 finalists from the 1972 Games returned: gold medalist Anatoliy Bondarchuk of the Soviet Union, silver medalist Jochen Sachse of East Germany, seventh-place finisher Edwin Klein of West Germany, eighth-place finisher Shigenobu Murofushi of Japan, tenth-place finisher Karl-Hans Riehm of West Germany, seventeenth-place finisher Peter Sternad of Austria, and nineteenth-place finisher Jacques Accambray of France. The Soviets and West Germans were favored, particularly Yuriy Sedykh and Karl-Hans Riehm.

New Zealand made its debut in the event. The United States appeared for the 17th time, the only nation to have competed at each appearance of the event to that point.

Competition format

The competition consisted of two rounds, qualification and final. Each athlete received three throws in the qualifying round. All who achieved the qualifying distance of 69.00 metres progressed to the final. If fewer than twelve athletes achieved this mark, then the twelve furthest throwing athletes would reach the final. Each finalist was allowed three throws in last round, with the top eight athletes after that point being given three further attempts.

Records

Prior to the competition, the existing world and Olympic records were as follows.

Yuriy Sedykh broke the Olympic record with his second throw of the final, at 77.52 metres. That throw was unbeaten through the rest of the competition. Aleksey Spiridonov also (but later) bettered the old record, with 76.08 metres; Anatoliy Bondarchuk's best throw was 2 centimetres short of his own old record.

Schedule

All times are Eastern Daylight Time (UTC-4)

Results

Qualifying

Qual. rule: qualification standard 69.00m (Q) or at least best 12 qualified (q).

Final

References

External links
 Official Olympic Report , la84foundation.org. Retrieved August 18, 2012.

Athletics at the 1976 Summer Olympics
Hammer throw at the Olympics
Men's events at the 1976 Summer Olympics